Leslie Harry Ernest Bury CMG (25 February 1913 – 7 September 1986) was an Australian politician and economist. He was a member of the Liberal Party and served in the House of Representatives between 1956 and 1974, representing the Division of Wentworth. He held ministerial office in Coalition governments for nearly a decade, serving as Minister for Air (1961–1962), Housing (1963–1966), Labour and National Service (1966–1969), Treasurer (1969–1971) and Foreign Affairs (1971).

Early life
Bury was born in Willesden, London, England, the son of Doris Elma (née Walgrave) and Ernest Bury. His father was an Anglican clergyman. Bury attended Herne Bay College in Kent before matriculating at Queens' College, Cambridge. His education was financed by scholarships and financial assistance from an uncle. He graduated Bachelor of Arts in 1934 and was a member of the Cambridge University Conservative Association. His lecturers at Cambridge included John Maynard Keynes and Joan Robinson, both of whom made a lasting impression.

Bury moved to Sydney in December 1935 to work in the economic department of the Bank of New South Wales. He assisted general manager Alfred Charles Davidson during the 1935 Banking Royal Commission. He married Anne Weigall on 23 August 1940, with whom he had four sons. Bury enlisted in the army in 1942, serving with heavy artillery fixed defences and with the 12th Australian Radar Detachment. He worked in the Department of the Treasury in the 1940s and later worked as Executive Director of the International Bank for Reconstruction and Development and the Australian representative on the International Monetary Fund from 1951 to 1956.

Political career

Bury was elected to the House of Representatives at the 1956 Wentworth by-election, following the resignation of Eric Harrison to become High Commissioner to the United Kingdom. According to Peter King, he "... would attend football matches with Labor leader Arthur Calwell in Melbourne and ... [shadow Treasurer] Frank Crean stayed at the Bury home in Sydney".

Menzies Government
Bury was appointed Minister for Air and Minister assisting the Treasurer in Robert Menzies' ninth ministry in December 1961. On 27 July 1962 he was sacked for speaking in favour of the accession of the United Kingdom to the European Economic Community, saying that "European integration, of which the Common Market is an essential expression, is a keystone of the grand design for Western survival".  This strongly conflicted with Deputy Prime Minister John McEwen's concerns over its impact on Australian exports to the United Kingdom. In December 1963, he returned to cabinet as Minister for Housing. He introduced the First Home Owners Grant, which continues to be a feature of the Australian political landscape.

Holt Government
In January 1966, Bury became Minister for Labour and National Service in Harold Holt's first ministry, during the Vietnam War, when he was responsible for implementing conscription.

After Holt's disappearance in December 1966, Bury was one of four candidates to contest the Liberal leadership ballot, along with John Gorton, Paul Hasluck, and Billy Snedden. He had some support within the party, including from Peter Howson, and was reportedly Menzies' second most preferred candidate after Hasluck. According to Graham Freudenberg much of his support was due to his status as the only candidate from New South Wales. However, he was virtually unknown among the general public and was not seen as a strong television performer. Bury polled an estimated 16 votes (out of 81) on the first ballot, ahead of only Snedden. Both were eliminated and Gorton went on to defeat Hasluck in the final ballot.

Gorton Government
Bury remained Minister for Labour and National Service in the first Gorton ministry. With Phillip Lynch as Minister for the Army, a slogan chanted at anti-war protests was "lynch Bury and bury Lynch". After the 1969 federal election, Bury was promoted to treasurer, his most desired portfolio. His promotion was probably due to his support for Gorton in the 1969 leadership spill, which saw then-treasurer William McMahon challenge for the prime ministership. McMahon was shifted to foreign affairs and Bury took his place as treasurer. Gorton also reputedly viewed Bury as someone who was likely to be compliant and not challenge his own economic agenda.

Bury presented only a single budget as treasurer, for 1970–71. It was described as "very much a Treasury-inspired document", and also had significant input from Gorton. He was one of the pioneers of the forward estimates system, in March 1971 asking ministers to provide estimates of expenditure for future activities. He was an advocate of alternative measures of economic progress, stating "we must not fall too readily to exclusive worship at the altar of GNP [...] our prime concern should always be the social welfare of the community as a whole". He was also an early supporter of a broad-based national consumption tax, akin to the current GST.

There were concerns about Bury's health during his period as treasurer, with one source describing him as "a worn-out and a tired man, suffering from ill-health and lacking concentration". He suffered from coronary arteriosclerosis and hypertension. Bury's departmental secretary Dick Randall stated that, from Treasury's perspective, he "lost too many cabinet fights". He came into conflict with the more experienced figures of Gorton, McEwen, and McMahon who were not always in agreement with the departmental agenda. He opposed the creation of the Australian Industry Development Corporation, preferring the use of foreign capital, but was overridden by McEwen and Gorton.

McMahon Government

When William McMahon became Prime Minister in March 1971, he initially retained Bury as Treasurer, but 12 days later moved him to the Foreign Affairs portfolio, and sacked him in August 1971. He retired from parliament at the 1974 federal election after losing Liberal preselection to Bob Ellicott.

Bury was the only Liberal Treasurer who was not and did not subsequently become his party's deputy leader until Joe Hockey.

Later life
Bury retired from parliament in 1974 due to ill health. In the Queen's Birthday Honours of June 1979, he was appointed a Companion of the Order of St Michael and St George (CMG), in recognition of his service to the Parliament of Australia.

Bury died in Sydney in 1986 and was survived by his wife Anne and his four sons, Peter, Michael, John and Nicholas.

External links
 Leslie Bury – from Treasury to Treasurer – short biographical profile focusing on his economic philosophy
  Address to Canberra Institute of Management  – excerpts from the speech that got Bury sacked (25 July 1962)

Notes 

Members of the Cabinet of Australia
Australian ministers for Foreign Affairs
Liberal Party of Australia members of the Parliament of Australia
Members of the Australian House of Representatives for Wentworth
Members of the Australian House of Representatives
1913 births
1986 deaths
Australian Companions of the Order of St Michael and St George
Australian public servants
20th-century Australian politicians
Alumni of Queens' College, Cambridge
English emigrants to Australia
Australian economists
Australian Army personnel of World War II
People from Willesden
Australian Army officers